Wexford Youths Women Football Club is an Irish association football club based in Crossabeg, County Wexford. Their senior team plays in the Women's National League. In recent seasons Wexford Youths have emerged as one of the league's strongest teams. 

As Women's National League winners, they represented Ireland in the UEFA Women's Champions League in Poland in 2015, at home in Wexford in 2016, in Belfast in 2018 and in Lithuania in 2019

History

Women's National League 

In 2011–12 Wexford Youths, together with Peamount United, Castlebar Celtic, Cork Women's F.C., Raheny United and Shamrock Rovers, became founder members of the Women's National League. Youths finished third in both 2012–13 and 2013–14. In 2013–14 they also won their first trophy, the WNL Cup, after defeating Castlebar Celtic 3–0 in the final at Ferrycarrig Park. In 2014–15 Youths won their first Women's National League title after finishing two points clear of second placed UCD Waves. The 2015–16 season saw Youths win a treble. They started the season by winning the FAI Women's Cup for the first time. In the final at the Aviva Stadium they defeated Shelbourne Ladies 4–2 on penalties after a 2–2 draw. Shelbourne Ladies would be Youths main challengers throughout the season. The two sides met again in the WNL Shield final, played at Ferrycarrig Park, on 30 March 2016. Wexford Youths again emerged as winners with Edel Kennedy scoring in the 1–0 win. In the league itself, the two teams finished level on points before Wexford Youths retained the title after a play-off. Youths travelled to Galway W.F.C. on Sunday, 8 May knowing a victory would secure them the league title. However Youths dropped their first league points away from home and could only manage a 1–1 draw. Youths had a second chance to clinch the title when they played Shelbourne Ladies at Tolka Park on Wednesday, 11 May. However Shelbourne Ladies won 3–1 and as result finished level on points with Youths. This meant the title would be decided by a play-off for the first time.  The play-off took place on Sunday, 22 May at Tallaght Stadium. It proved third time lucky for Wexford Youths as they finally secured the title with a 2–1 win. Shortly after guiding Youths to their second title, head coach Will Doyle announced he was resigning.

In June 2016, Gary Hunt was named as the new senior women's team manager, having been a coach under Will Doyle for the previous two years.

After one season in charge, Gary Hunt stepped down as manager of the club, replaced by former assistant manager Laura Heffernan.

In 2017 Heffernan secured Wexford Youths Women their third WNL title in 4 years, stepping down at the end of the season.

She was followed by Tom Elmes at the beginning of the 2018 Season. He guided the team to the treble that year and UEFA Women's Champions League qualification in 2019, The following year the team won the Senior cup in the Aviva stadium under Tom Elmes. Elmes departed in July 2021 to be appointed as Ireland's WU16 head coach and the Women's Senior team assistant coach to Vera Pauw.  He was replaced by his assistant Stephen Quinn.

In the season 2021 the team finished 3rd in the league and won the Women's Senior Cup under the leadership Of Stephen Quinn.

Players

Current squad

Former players

Republic of Ireland women's internationals

Wexford Youths in Europe

2015–16 UEFA Women's Champions League
After winning the 2014–15 Women's National League title, Wexford Youths qualified for UEFA Women's Champions League for the first time. They played in Group 7 and finished second after winning two out of three games.

2016–17 UEFA Women's Champions League
After winning the 2015–16 Women's National League title, Wexford Youths qualified for UEFA Women's Champions League for a second time. Wexford Youths have been announced as hosts of one of the group stage tournaments with games due to be played at both Ferrycarrig Park and the Waterford Regional Sports Centre.
Group 7

Honours
Women's National League
Winners: 2014–15, 2015–16, 2017, 2018: 4
FAI Women's Cup
Winners: 2015, 2018, 2019, 2021: 4
Runners-up: 2016: 1
WNL Cup
Winners: 2013–14 1
Runners-up: 2018, 2019: 2
WNL Shield
Winners: 2015–16, 2018 2

References

 
Women's National League (Ireland) teams
Women's association football clubs in the Republic of Ireland
Women